Michael Jones (born June 13, 1962), better known by his ring name Virgil (a reference to Dusty Rhodes' given name), is an American former professional wrestler and actor. He is best known for his eight-year tenure in the World Wrestling Federation (WWF), primarily as Ted DiBiase's personal assistant.

In his four-year tenure in World Championship Wrestling (WCW), he notably went under the ring names Vincent, Curly Bill and Shane, which like his ring name in the WWF, was also intended as a rib, referencing Vince McMahon, Bill Watts and Shane McMahon. He briefly appeared as the manager of Ernest "The Cat" Miller, and was then used as a jobber, before departing in 2000. From 1996 to 1998, he was a member of the New World Order, as well as with two associated sub-groups (nWo Hollywood and nWo Black & White) from 1998 to 1999. He was also a member of the West Texas Rednecks in late 1999. In 2019 and 2020, he made appearances for All Elite Wrestling (AEW) under the ring name Soul Train Jones.

Early life
Michael Jones was born on June 13, 1962 in Wilkinsburg, Pennsylvania, to Warren Jones Sr. and Elizabeth Jones. He has two older brothers, Warren Jr. and Donald, and a sister, Antoinette, who still lives in Wilkinsburg. He attended Virginia Union University, and played as a defensive back for the college football team. Jones later worked for a loading and moving company that was owned by an uncle of his, and began entering bodybuilding competitions. A chance meeting with Tony Atlas in a Pittsburgh gym saw Atlas recommend Jones to the World Wrestling Federation (WWF), resulting in his debut match for the promotion in 1986.

Professional wrestling career

Championship Wrestling Association (1985–1987)
Jones started wrestling professionally as Soul Train Jones in the Championship Wrestling Association based in Memphis, Tennessee in 1985. There, he feuded with Chick Donovan and Big Bubba. On January 4, 1987, he defeated Big Bubba for the AWA International Heavyweight Championship. On April 20, he was defeated by Donovan, ending his reign at 106 days. During this reign, he also participated in a tournament for the vacant AWA Southern Heavyweight Championship, defeating Tommy Rich, The Hunter and Goliath on his way to the final, where he was defeated by Austin Idol. He would also unsuccessfully challenge Nick Bockwinkel for the AWA World Heavyweight Championship. Alongside Rocky Johnson, he later held the AWA Southern Tag Team Championship for 28 days, until they were defeated by Donovan and Jack Hart.

World Wrestling Federation (1986–1994, 1995)

Ted DiBiase's bodyguard and Million Dollar Champion (1986–1991)

Moving to the World Wrestling Federation (WWF), he first appeared as a jobber wrestling under the name Lucius Brown, losing a squash match to "Mr. Wonderful" Paul Orndorff in Salisbury, Maryland on September 17, 1986. After this, he would return to Memphis to continue training.

He then went on to debut in the summer of 1987 as Virgil, the bodyguard for "Million Dollar Man" Ted DiBiase. His stage name, thought up by Bobby Heenan, was meant as a jab against then-World Championship Wrestling (WCW) wrestler and booker Virgil Runnels, better known as Dusty Rhodes. Virgil carried DiBiase's cash that he liked to flaunt and was the one who got beaten up while DiBiase ran away after a devious act against a face. He would also occasionally be used in a wrestling capacity against DiBiase's rivals to try and soften them up; he would lose matches to such names as Randy Savage, Hercules and Jake Roberts.

Virgil was increasingly humiliated by DiBiase and eventually turned on him, hitting him with his own Million Dollar Title belt at the Royal Rumble in January 1991, making him a fan favorite. After befriending and training with Roddy Piper, he defeated DiBiase by count-out at WrestleMania VII and pinned him for the belt on August 26, 1991 at SummerSlam. He lost the belt back to DiBiase in November of that year as a result of outside interference by the Repo Man. At This Tuesday in Texas, Repo Man and DiBiase defeated Virgil and Tito Santana.

Various storylines and departure (1992—1994, 1995) 
At WrestleMania VIII, Virgil teamed with Big Boss Man, Sgt. Slaughter, and Jim Duggan to defeat The Nasty Boys (Brian Knobbs and Jerry Sags), Repo Man, and The Mountie. Virgil pinned Knobbs following a heel miscommunication. He would then primarily be used to put over numerous rising talents, losing to Nailz at SummerSlam and Yokozuna at Survivor Series. However, he did receive a shot at Bret Hart's WWF World Heavyweight Championship on the November 21, 1992 episode of WWF Superstars. After a valiant effort, Virgil submitted to Hart's Sharpshooter. After the match, the two shook hands out of respect. Virgil then remained in the undercard, losing to Johnny Polo on a tour of Ontario in November 1993.

Virgil's last appearance on a PPV event was the Royal Rumble where he was a late substitute for Kamala. His last notable feud was with a returning Nikolai Volkoff in the summer of 1994. However he continued to perform on television and on the house show circuit for the WWF until he was released that August.

He was booked per appearance in May/June 1995 for house show matches against Jean-Pierre LaFitte in Western Canada and the US Midwest.

National Wrestling Conference (1995)
On August 25, 1995, Virgil competed in the National Wrestling Conference in the supercard event "Night of Champions". It was a match on the undercard, however, that aroused controversy when Virgil's opponent, The Thug, came out to the ring dressed in a KKK hood. The Thug was accompanied by another man dressed in a full KKK outfit who revealed himself as Jim "The Anvil" Neidhart. Both men proceeded to attack Virgil with Neidhart rolling the KKK robe into a noose and hanging Virgil on the outside ropes. The 2-on-1 assault finally ended when the building's security dragged Neidhart to the back and Virgil was carried away on a stretcher.

World Championship Wrestling (1996–2000)

New World Order (1996—99) 
Following two years on the independent scene, he appeared in WCW as Vincent in 1996, where he was the "Head of Security" for the nWo. His name was meant to be a mockery of WWF owner Vince McMahon. His role was originally meant for Charles Wright and WCW had verbally agreed to a contract with Wright, but signed Jones instead, reportedly after Jones offered to work for less than Wright.

Jones had minor success when first arriving, winning a few matches on the low profile WCW Saturday Night. Rarely wrestling, he often valeted nWo members such as Scott Norton, Scott Steiner, Konnan, and Brian Adams. Jones, like his role in the WWF, would again take the brunt of the beatings as other nWo members scurried away. Vincent's first PPV match with WCW was at Starrcade 1997, when he teamed with Norton and Randy Savage to defeat the Steiner Brothers and Ray Traylor. His next match on pay-per-view came in November 1998, when he unsuccessfully competed in the 60-man Battle Royal match at World War 3. His first (and only) WCW PPV singles match was a "Harlem Street Fight" match (which he lost) at Uncensored in March 1999 against fellow nWo Black & White member Stevie Ray.

He was part of the nWo Hollywood faction when the stable split in the Spring of 1998, and then part of the Black & White (B-Team) after the nWo reunited in January 1999. He was one of the last remaining members of the nWo when it quietly dissolved in late Summer of 1999.

Various gimmicks (1999—2000) 
Vincent's only WCW singles match on pay per view came at Uncensored when he was on the losing end of a Harlem Street Fight against his nWo Black & White partner Stevie Ray. During the "Powers That Be" angle in fall of 1999, Jones was renamed Shane, a reference to WWF owner Vince McMahon's son Shane McMahon. During this time Jones teamed with Curt Hennig and the Harris Brothers (known briefly as Creative Control), doing Vince Russo's bidding. In late 1999, he joined the West Texas Rednecks under the name of Curly Bill, but the faction split shortly after. His last role for the company saw him managing Ernest "The Cat" Miller under the name Mr. Jones, but he was soon replaced by a valet named Ms. Jones. He would then work under his real name, Mike Jones, where he was used as a jobber.

Independent circuit (2006–2020)

In April 2006, Jones toured Asia at different US Military installations as part of the Morale, Welfare, and Recreation program for soldiers stationed overseas. He wrestled as Vincent of the nWo against one of the Ballard Brothers dressed as Doink the Clown in the second to last match during this tour. On November 28, 2008, Jones returned to the ring as "Virgil" and wrestled for Next Era Wrestling in Lockport, New York, in a tag match with Patrick O'Malley, defeating Ryot and Superbeast. He then appeared at a Total Nonstop Action (TNA) show.

Shortly prior to January 31, 2009 in Manchester, England, Virgil had produced a promo for UK fan convention WrestleSlam 2 calling out Liverpool independent wrestler The Vulture for a proposed "shoot". However, when The Vulture arrived at the event, Virgil instead offered him a T-shirt. On July 2, 2009, Jones returned to the ring, once again, in Summerside, Prince Edward Island, as Virgil, this time for Ultimate Championship Wrestling (UCW). On December 1, 2017, he wrestled a match for Preston City Wrestling (PCW) at Joey Janela's Big Top Adventure, held at the Blackpool Tower Circus.

On April 5, 2019, Virgil, dressed as the character Starman from NES Pro Wrestling, appeared at Joey Janela's Spring Break 3, where he defeated Ethan Page in a squash match. In late 2020, Virgil made a cameo in the ball for a ball match at Talk'N ShopAMania 2, hosted by the Good Brothers.

Return to WWE (2010)
On the May 17, 2010 episode of Raw from Toronto, Ontario, Canada, Jones returned to WWE reprising his Virgil bodyguard character, this time with Ted DiBiase Jr. He carried out all of his old actions, such as holding the ropes open for DiBiase and bringing him a microphone when asked. On the June 14 episode of Raw, Virgil and DiBiase were in a tag team match against Big Show and Raw guest host Mark Feuerstein. After Virgil got pinned and lost the match, DiBiase stuffed a $100 bill in Virgil's mouth and walked out on him. The following week, DiBiase first apologized to Virgil, but then fired him and replaced him with Maryse.

All Elite Wrestling (2019–2020)
From 2019 to 2020, Virgil, under his old ring name of Soul Train Jones, began making recurring appearances for All Elite Wrestling (AEW), as an ally of Chris Jericho and The Inner Circle. On the November 6, 2019 episode of Dynamite, he appeared in a video package that mocked an earlier promo from Cody Rhodes (whom Jericho was feuding with at the time). The promo saw Jones compare Jericho's talents to Olive Garden breadsticks as "unlimited" and it received critical praise from fans. On the November 27 episode of Dynamite, Jones started off the show by introducing Jericho for Chris Jericho's Thanksgiving Thank You Celebration for Le Champion, which was ultimately interrupted by SoCal Uncensored. On the April 29, 2020 episode of Dynamite, Jones made a cameo during the Inner Circle's Bubbly Bunch segment, appearing in the Manitoba Melee.

Outside of wrestling

Post-fame, Jones has been attending conventions and has been seen at subway stations selling autographs; as a result, since 2012, there have been "Lonely Virgil" memes created where fans posted pictures of him at conventions with nobody lining up. Lonely Virgil was originally created by Sam Roberts of the Opie and Anthony radio show.

In 2014, Jones appeared in the Jason Michael Brescia film, Bridge and Tunnel as Kony, a neighborhood barfly. Jones was cast in the film after he met actor-producer Joe Murphy while selling autographs at Grand Central Station. In 2017, he reprised the role in Brescia's follow-up film, (Romance) in the Digital Age.

In 2015, a documentary featuring Jones was released entitled The Legend of Virgil & His Traveling Merchandise Table, which discusses his wrestling career and the recent upsurge of social media discussions surrounding him.

In an interview with ESPN.com in 2016, DiBiase revealed that he and Jones had a falling out over Jones booking independent wrestling shows for the two without DiBiase's knowledge, which led to DiBiase unknowingly no-showing the events. DiBiase had to apologize to the promotions for the unintentional no-shows and had to stress that Jones does not represent him for bookings.

In 2016, he appeared on the "Old School" and the "Addicted to the Shindig" episodes of The Edge and Christian Show on the WWE Network.

Filmography

Personal life
Since 2018, he has resided in Marianna, Pennsylvania, with his friend and roommate, Shawn Raneri. Raneri, a former union representative and college football coach, came across and quickly befriended Jones, who at that point was almost homeless. On April 16, 2022, Jones revealed that he had previously suffered two strokes and had been diagnosed with dementia. A month later, he was diagnosed with stage one gastrointestinal cancer.

Championships and accomplishments
American Wrestling Association
AWA International Heavyweight Championship (1 time)
AWA Southern Tag Team Championship (1 time) – with Rocky Johnson
New Jack City Wrestling
NJCW Heavyweight Championship (1 time)
Pro Wrestling Illustrated
Ranked No. 74 of the top 500 singles wrestlers in the PWI 500 in 1992
Ranked No. 483 of the top 500 singles wrestlers in the PWI Years in 2003
United States Wrestling League
USWL Intercontinental Championship (1 time)
World Wrestling Federation
Million Dollar Championship (1 time)
 Wrestling Observer Newsletter
 Best Gimmick (1996) – nWo
 Feud of the Year (1996) New World Order vs. World Championship Wrestling

References

External links

 

1962 births
Living people
People from Wilkinsburg, Pennsylvania
20th-century African-American sportspeople
20th-century professional wrestlers
21st-century African-American people
21st-century professional wrestlers
African-American male professional wrestlers
American male professional wrestlers
Black conservatism in the United States
Million Dollar Champions
New World Order (professional wrestling) members
People with dementia
Professional wrestling managers and valets
Virginia Union University alumni
Virginia Union Panthers football players
AWA International Heavyweight Champions